Edward Peter Raynes  (born ) is Professor of Optoelectronic Engineering at the University of Oxford (since 1998). He was, and continues to be, an early developer and advocate of liquid crystal displays (LCDs).

Raynes obtained his PhD from the University of Cambridge; he then worked at RSRE (Malvern) for 21 years until 1991. He is a Fellow of St Cross College.
He has been the chief scientist of Sharp Laboratories (Europe) since 1992.

Awards
 IoP Paterson medal 1986
 Society of Information Display

Selected publications
 Electro-optic response times in liquid crystals, E. Jakeman, and E. P. Raynes, Physics Letters A, Vol. 39, Iss. 1, p. 69-70 1972. 
 Improved contrast uniformity in twisted nematic liquid-crystal electro-optic display devices, E P Raynes, Electronics Letters. Vol. 10, pp. 141–142. (1974)
 Recent advances in liquid crystal materials and display devices, E. P. Raynes, IEEE Transactions on Electron Devices, vol. ED-26, p. 1116-1122 (1979).
 Supertwisted nematic liquid crystal displays (review), E. P. Raynes and C. M. Waters,  Displays, Vol. 8, Iss. 2, pp. 59–63 (1987) 
 Optical studies of thin layers of smectic-C materials, Anderson, M.H., Jones, J.C., Raynes, E.P., Towler, M.J., Journal of Physics D: Applied Physics, Vol. 24, Iss. 3, pp. 338–342  (1991) 
 Ferroelectric liquid crystal display, Koden, M., et al., Shapu Giho/Sharp Technical Journal, Iss. 69, pp. 47–50 (1997)

References

External links
 St Cross information
 St Cross Fellows

1945 births
Living people
Fellows of St Cross College, Oxford
Fellows of the Royal Society
English physicists
Engineering academics
Alumni of Gonville and Caius College, Cambridge
Sharp Corporation people
Academics of the University of Oxford